Väinö Viktor Kajander (later Kajukorpi, 30 November 1893 – 16 September 1978) was a welterweight Greco-Roman wrestler from Finland who won a silver medal at the 1932 Olympics. Kajander was a machinist by profession. He retired from wrestling in 1936, aged 43.

References

External links
 

1893 births
1978 deaths
People from Elimäki
People from Uusimaa Province (Grand Duchy of Finland)
Olympic wrestlers of Finland
Wrestlers at the 1932 Summer Olympics
Finnish male sport wrestlers
Olympic silver medalists for Finland
Olympic medalists in wrestling
Medalists at the 1932 Summer Olympics
Sportspeople from Kymenlaakso
19th-century Finnish people
20th-century Finnish people